Wokingham by-election may refer to:

 1898 Wokingham by-election
 1901 Wokingham by-election